Poole is a surname, and may refer to:

Adalbert Poole (1881–1970), Canadian politician
Andrew Poole (cricketer) (born 1967), English cricketer
Andy Poole (footballer) (born 1960), English footballer
Austin Lane Poole (1889–1963), British mediaevalist
Barney Poole (1923–2005), American football player
Ben Poole, British blues rock guitarist, singer, and songwriter. 
Bertram William Henry Poole (1880–1957), British-American philatelist
Brian Poole (born 1941), British singer and entertainer, lead singer of Brian Poole and the Tremeloes
Bruce Poole (born 1959), American politician
Cecil Charles Poole (1885–1970), British politician
Cecil F. Poole (1914–1997), American lawyer and judge
Charles Poole (1874–1941), New Zealand politician
Charles Lane Poole (1885–1970), Australian forester
Charlie Poole (1892–1931), American banjo player
Christopher "Kit" Poole (1875–1965), Irish Citizen Army officer during the 1916 Easter Rising
Christopher Poole (born c.1988), American founder of web sites 4chan and Canvas
Cyril Poole (1921–1996), English cricketer and footballer
Daniel Poole (1882–1959), Australian seaman and soldier
David Poole (disambiguation), several people
Dianne Poole (born 1949), Canadian politician
Dick Poole (disambiguation), several people
Earl Lincoln Poole (1891–1972), American wildlife artist, sculptor, author and naturalist
Ed Poole (1874–1919), American baseball player
Elizabeth Poole (1588–1654), English settler in Plymouth Colony
Eric Poole (1885–1916), British Army officer of World War I
Eric Joseph Poole (1907–1969), Canadian politician
Eric Poole, fictional character and primary antagonist in the Robert Cormier novel Tenderness
Ernest Poole  (1880–1950), American novelist
Eugene J. Poole (1880–1958), American politician
Fanny Huntington Runnells Poole (1863–1940), American writer, book reviewer
Frank Poole, fictional character in Arthur C. Clarke's Space Odyssey science fiction series
Freddi Poole (born 1946), American singer
Frederic Slaney Poole (1845–1936), Anglican priest in South Australia
Gary Poole (born 1967), English footballer
George Temple-Poole (1856–1934), British architect 
Glenn Poole (born 1981), English footballer
Grace Poole, fictional character in Charlotte Brontë's 1847 novel Jane Eyre
Harold Poole (1943–2014), American bodybuilder
Henry Poole (disambiguation), several people
Hester Martha Poole (1833–1932), American writer, artist, advocate
Horatio Nelson Poole (1884–1949), American painter and printmaker
Ike Poole (1915–2002), American basketball player
James Poole (disambiguation), several people
Jim Poole (disambiguation), several people
Joe Poole (born 1923), English footballer
John Poole (disambiguation), several people
Jon Poole (born 1969), English singer and songwriter
Jonas Poole (c.1566–1612), English explorer, sealer, and whaler
Jordan Poole (born 1999), American basketball player
Karen Poole (born 1971), British singer and songwriter, daughter of Brian
Keith Poole (born 1974), American football player
Kenny Poole (1947–2006), American jazz guitarist
Kevin Poole (born 1963), English football player
Lynn Poole (1910–1969), American science writer and broadcaster
Malcolm Poole (born 1949), Australian field hockey player
Marin Poole (born 1984), American beauty queen 
Mark Poole, American illustrator
Marshall Scott Poole (born 1951), American communication researcher
Matthew Poole (1624–1679), English theologian
Minor Butler Poole (1920–1942), United States Navy sailor, Navy Cross recipient
Nate Poole (born 1977), American football player
Nick Poole (born 1973), Canadian ice hockey player 
Oliver Poole, 1st Baron Poole (1911–1993), British politician, soldier and businessman
Olivia Poole (1889–1975), American inventor
Paul Falconer Poole (1806–1879), British painter
Phil Poole (born 1959), American Democratic politician
Phillip Poole (born 1981), British ice dancer
Ray Poole (1921–2008), American football player
Reg Poole (born 1944), Australian musician
Reg Poole (footballer) (1942–2021), Australian footballer
Regan Poole (born 1998), Welsh football player
Reginald Lane Poole (1857–1939), British historian
Reginald Stuart Poole (1832–1895), English orientalist
Sir Reginald Ward Poole (1864–1941), British solicitor, President of the Law Society
Robert Poole (disambiguation), multiple people
Roger Poole (1946-2015), British trade union official
Rose M. Poole (1880-1963), American businesswoman and politician
Russell Poole (1956–2015), American policeman from Los Angeles
Sandra Le Poole (born 1959), Dutch field hockey player
Shelly Poole (born 1972), English songwriter and singer, daughter of Brian
Sophia Lane Poole (1804–1891), English orientalist
Stafford Poole (1930–2020), American historian
Stanley Lane-Poole (1854–1931), British orientalist, archaeologist and writer
Steven Poole (born 1972), British writer and journalist
Suzelle Poole (born 1940), British ballet dancer and poet
Teresa Poole (born 1964), Australian Paralympic cyclist
Terry Poole (disambiguation)
Theodore L. Poole (1840–1900), American politician from New York
Thomas Poole (disambiguation), several people
Trevor Poole (born 1964), Australian footballer
Tyrone Poole (born 1972), American football player
Vicki Poole, New Zealand diplomat
Wakefield Poole (1936–2021), American dancer, choreographer, and director
Will Poole (born 1981), American football player
William Poole (disambiguation), several people
William Frederick Poole (1821-1894), American bibliographer and librarian

See also
Pool (surname)
Poole (disambiguation)

English-language surnames